The Final Fight or variant may refer to:

 Ip Man: The Final Fight (2013 film), Hong Kong biopic about Ip Man
 Turrican II: The Final Fight (1991 video game), Commodore Amiga computer game by Factor 5
 Street Fighter 2010: The Final Fight (1990 video game), NES sidescrolling beat'em up
 Final Fight series of beat'em up video games from Capcom
 Final Fight (video game) (1989 arcade game), video game by Capcom, first in the series
 Mighty Final Fight (1993 video game), NES sidescrolling beat'em up
 Final Fight 2 (1993 video game), SNES sidescrolling beat'em up 
 Final Fight 3 (1995 video game), SNES sidescrolling beat'em up
 Final Fight Revenge (1999 video game), Sega Saturn beat'em up
 Final Fight: Streetwise (2006 video game), Xbox & PS2 beat'em up

See also
 Final Fight Championship, European fight promoter